Gregory William Frux (born March 25, 1958) is a traditional realist artist, working mainly in the landscape genre.  His oil paintings document both New York’s cityscapes and wilderness locations in North and South America.

Life and career 

Gregory Frux was born in Brooklyn, New York, on March 25, 1958.  His father was an engineer and later school teacher who emigrated from Lvov, Poland in August 1939.  His mother was grade school math teacher, who later taught adult literacy.  It was through their teachings and examples that Frux developed his passion for art and native city.  Gregory Frux married artist Janet Ellen Morgan in 1990.

Frux pursued art training at the Brooklyn Museum Art School, Art Students League and National Academy of Design where he studied with Harvey Dinnerstein  while simultaneously earning a Bachelor of Architecture and subsequent license as an architect.  From 1983 to 1989 Frux worked as an Architect for the New York City Board of Education (BOE) designing school additions and modernizations.  In order to pursue his passion for art in public schools, in 1989 Frux moved to the newly created Public Art for Public Schools unit of the BOE, which is responsible for protection of 1500 works of art owned The City of New York.  As a curator Frux catalogued, protected and helped conserved this significant collection from 1989 to 2006.

While working for the Board of Education, Frux completed his Master of Fine Arts from Brooklyn College in 1986, studying with noted realist Lennart Anderson.  After coursework in Carrara, Italy, in 1984 he became increasingly dedicated to outdoor painting.  Frux worked most often in Lower Manhattan; along the East River; and in Brooklyn’s Park Slope, Coney Island, and Gowanus Canal areas, painting on site in oils.  Frux is deeply engaged with the layers of urban history seen in abandoned and repurposed buildings, industrial architecture, and the resurgence of nature along the harbor.  His cityscapes have received recognition with exhibitions at Brooklyn Borough Hall, Brooklyn College, the Coney Island Museum, Long Island University, the Brooklyn Public Library's Central Library, The Tabla Rasa Gallery and a commission by the Metropolitan Transportation Authority.

Frux is deeply interested in the wilderness both aesthetically and as mountaineer.  His climbing career has dovetailed with creative work in increasingly remote locations.  Frux has served as artist in residence in four national park units:  Weir Farm National Historic Site in Wilton, Connecticut; Glacier National Park; Joshua Tree National Park; Death Valley National Park, and Mount Washington Observatory.  Frux was the first artist in residence at the Mount Washington Observatory, White Mountains New Hampshire and held an exhibit there after his residency.  He has painted in the Rocky Mountains, Andes, Sierra Nevada, and Mojave Desert, including ‘portraits’ of significant peaks such as Cerro Fitzroy, Sajama and Lotus Flower Tower.  This work have been included in the permanent collection of the National Park Service and exhibited by the American Alpine Club.  In December 2007 Frux traveled as artist in residence aboard the cruise ship Orlova to the Antarctic Peninsula; his paintings of "Half Moon Bay, South Shetland Islands" have been published as a print.  He worked as an artist aboard ship "Midnatsol" in Arctic Norway, November–December 2009.

Publications 
 1999 - “Putting the glow on the Big Apple”
 2000 - "NEIGHBORHOOD REPORT: PARK SLOPE; In Praise of Urban Landscape"
 2004-05 - "Journey to the Lotus" and cover artist of Whole Terrain's volume on 'Risk'
 2005 - “Death Valley National Park hosts visiting artists” Pahrump Valley Times
 In October 2010, Ann Japenga published an article about the work of Mr. Frux and his wife, Janet E. Morgan, titled, "Janet Morgan and Gregory Frux: Bringing Back Expedition Art".
 Contributing Writer for Professional Artist magazine (formerly published title "Art Calendar")

Collections

Institutional Collections
 Death Valley National Park
 Joshua Tree National Park
 Glacier National Park
 MetroTech Center BID
 National Museum of Art of Kyrgyzstan
 New York City Department of Education
 Metropolitan Transportation Authority
 New York University—Fales Library and Special Collection
 Universal Diagnostic Laboratories
 United States Library of Congress
 American Mountaineering Museum
 Samuel Dorsky Museum of Art at the University of New York at New Paltz
 Mount Washington Observatory

Shown on loan
 United States Embassies in Madagascar and Ethiopia under the Federal Art in the Embassies Program
 From June 2, 2019 to June 15, 2019, Frux rented the Patrons' Gallery of the Salmagundi Club in New York City, displaying a collection of nature paintings titled "Gardens, Cliffs and Canyons"

Private Collections
 Maria Henle (estate) artist & master printmaker
 Nomi Silverman, artist & printmaker
 Kevin Burke, President & CEO of Con Edison
 Samuel Delany, Hugo Award winning science fiction author and scholar
 Steven Larsen, author of Shaman's Doorway, Center for Symbolic Studies
 Warrington Colescott, master printmaker
 Alex Grey, visionary artist 
 Deborah Chaney, master printmaker

Notes

External links 

Art and Adventures

Public Art for Public Schools

20th-century American painters
American male painters
21st-century American painters
21st-century American male artists
1958 births
Living people
Brooklyn College alumni
20th-century American male artists